The 2021 season was the Tennessee Titans' 52nd season in the National Football League, their 62nd overall, their 25th in the state of Tennessee, and their fourth under head coach Mike Vrabel. After a 34–3 win over the Miami Dolphins in Week 17, the Titans clinched the AFC South for the second consecutive season. This would be the first time since 1960–1962 that the franchise would win their division in back-to-back seasons. The Titans finished 12–5, improving on their 11–5 record from the prior year and earning the AFC's #1 seed in the playoffs for the first time since 2008. However, their season ended with a 19–16 loss to the eventual AFC champion Cincinnati Bengals, their third-straight playoff loss dating back three seasons.

Offseason

Coaching changes
On January 15, 2021, Titans offensive coordinator Arthur Smith was hired by the Atlanta Falcons to be their head coach after Smith helped the Titans reach franchise-high offensive production in 2020. Smith had been the Titans offensive coordinator for the previous two seasons and had been with the team since 2011. On January 29, 2021, tight ends coach Todd Downing was promoted to offensive coordinator and outside linebackers coach Shane Bowen was promoted to defensive coordinator. Bowen had been the de facto defensive coordinator in 2020, but his defense that season was ranked 30th in sacks and 28th in yards allowed per game.

Roster changes

Reserve/future free agent contracts

The Titans signed 14 players to futures contracts on January 11, 2021. Tight end Jared Pinkney was signed to a futures contract later on January 13, 2021. Linebacker Davin Bellamy and defensive lineman Daylon Mack were signed to futures contacts the next day on January 14, 2021. Wide receiver Mason Kinsey was signed to a futures contract on January 21, 2021. Finally, defensive back Maurice Smith was signed to a futures contract on February 1, 2021.

Free agents

Departures

Draft

Pre-draft Notes/Trades

 Titans received their 100th pick as a compensatory selection for the loss of Jack Conklin to the free agency market.
 Jacksonville traded a sixth-round selection (185) to Tennessee in exchange for a seventh-round selection (249) and linebacker Kamalei Correa.
 Kansas City traded a sixth-round selection (215) to Tennessee in exchange for a 2020 seventh-round selection originally acquired from New England via Denver.
 Sixth-round selection from Jacksonville was traded to the Los Angeles Chargers in exchange for the cornerback Desmond King.
Titans sent Isaiah Wilson and a 2022 seventh-round pick to the Miami for a 2021 seventh-round selection (232).

Undrafted free agents

Source:

Staff

Final roster

Team captains
Ryan Tannehill (QB)
Derrick Henry (RB)
Jeffery Simmons (DT)
Kevin Byard (FS)
Brett Kern (P)

Source:

Preseason

Regular season

Schedule
The Titans' 2021 schedule was announced on May 12.

Note: Intra-division opponents are in bold text.

Game summaries

Week 1: vs. Arizona Cardinals

The Titans began 0–1 for the first time since 2018, giving up six sacks on Ryan Tannehill. Cardinals outside linebacker Chandler Jones alone had five sacks, tying a Cardinals franchise record and earning him NFC Defensive Player of the Week. The Cardinals got up 17-0 in the second quarter before Tannehill ran in for a touchdown, however the extra point was missed by new kicker Michael Badgley. The Cardinals continued dominating on both sides of the ball, with Kyler Murray throwing for 289 yards and four touchdowns, and the defense holding Derrick Henry to 58 yards on 17 carries. Badgley would go on to miss a field goal as well, being waived the next day. The Titans only scored one touchdown, a pass from Tannehill to A. J. Brown, in the entire second half. The Titans would lose 38-13.

Week 2: at Seattle Seahawks

The Titans started the game slow, down 24-9 in the third quarter and 30-16 in the fourth. However they came back to tie, with Derrick Henry scoring on a one-yard touchdown run with 29 seconds left, making it 30-30 and forcing the game into overtime. New kicker Randy Bullock, kicked a game-winning 36-yard field goal in overtime to win 33-30. Henry rushed 35 times for 182 yards and two touchdowns, including a 60-yard TD in the fourth quarter. Henry would also catch a career high six receptions for 55 yards, winning AFC Offensive Player of the Week and FedEx Ground Player of the Week for his performance. Wide receiver Julio Jones caught six catches for 128 yards in his first 100-yard game with the Titans. Bullock made four of his five kicks, and would remain the Titans kicker for the rest of the season.

Week 3: vs. Indianapolis Colts

The Titans continued their season by beating the Colts 25-16, dropping the Colts to their first 0-3 start since 2011. The Titans offense turned the ball over three times, however the Titans defense only allowed the Colts to score one touchdown in the game and force them to try four field goal attempts. The Titans defense also held the Colts to just 25% on third down conversions and sacked Carson Wentz two times with 10 quarterback hits. Ryan Tannehill completed 18-of-27 passes for 197 yards, while also rushing for 56 yards on five carries. Derrick Henry rushed 28 times for 113 yards, once again winning the FedEx Ground Player of the Week. The Titans suffered several injuries in the game, with LB Bud Dupree already sidelined prior, WR A. J. Brown exiting the game in the first quarter, WR Julio Jones being unable to play in the final stages, and losing CB Kristian Fulton for a stretch.

Week 4: at New York Jets

The game lead tied or changed five times as Ryan Tannehill, overcoming seven sacks, completed a two-yard score to Cameron Batson that forced overtime.  After a Matt Ammendola field goal in overtime Randy Bullock missed a 49-yard attempt.  It was Tennessee’s fifth loss in the last nine meetings with the Jets and first overtime game against New York since a 31-28 loss in 1980.

Week 5: at Jacksonville Jaguars

Week 6: vs. Buffalo Bills

The Titans edged the Bills 34-31, winning on a fourth down stop of Bills quarterback Josh Allen at their 3-yard line in the final thirty seconds. The game lead changed seven times as Derrick Henry rushed for three touchdowns and 143 yards; he also caught two passes for thirteen yards.  Ryan Tannehill ran in a touchdown and completed eighteen passes for 216 yards; he completed fourteen of his last seventeen passes after starting with just four of his first twelve.

Week 7: vs. Kansas City Chiefs

This was the 55th career meeting between the two teams since founders Bud Adams and Lamar Hunt co-founded the American Football League but only the fifth meeting in Tennessee.  It was also the twelfth meeting since they were the Houston Oilers.   With the win the Titans moved to a 9-2 lifetime record against Chiefs coach Andy Reid.

Week 8: at Indianapolis Colts

The Titans rallied to the overtime win and only their third sweep of the Colts since formation of the AFC South.  But running back Derrick Henry was lost for the rest of the regular season with a foot injury that necessitated surgery and also the signing of Adrian Peterson.

Week 9: at Los Angeles Rams

In their first game without Henry, the Titans accounted for just 194 total yards on offense, but won due to a strong performance by their defense, which set up several short fields and intercepted Rams quarterback Matthew Stafford on two consecutive plays in the second quarter, with the second pick being returned for a touchdown.

Week 10: vs. New Orleans Saints

A Saints red zone interception was negated by a questionable roughing the passer call, which set up the Titans with 1st & Goal at the one yard line, resulting in a touchdown for Tennessee

Week 11: vs. Houston Texans

Week 12: at New England Patriots

Week 14: vs. Jacksonville Jaguars

Week 15: at Pittsburgh Steelers

Week 16: vs. San Francisco 49ers

Week 17: vs. Miami Dolphins

With this win, moving the Titans to 11-5, the Titans would clinch back-to-back AFC South titles for the first time since 1960–1962, when the Titans were still in the American Football League.

Week 18: at Houston Texans

With this win, the Titans would finish the season 12-5 and would clinch the #1 seed in the AFC for the first time since 2008.

Standings

Division

Conference

Postseason

Game summaries

AFC Divisional Playoffs: vs. (4) Cincinnati Bengals

Statistics

Team

Individual

Statistics correct as of the end of the 2021 NFL season

References

External links
 

Tennessee
Tennessee Titans seasons
AFC South championship seasons
Tennessee Titans